The First Dreyer cabinet was the state government of the German state of Rhineland-Palatinate from 18 May 2016 until 18 May 2021. The Cabinet was headed by Minister President Malu Dreyer and was formed by the Social Democratic Party, the Alliance '90/The Greens and the Free Democratic Party, after the 2016 Rhineland-Palatinate state election. On 18 May 2016 Dreyer was elected and sworn in as Minister President by the Landtag of Rhineland-Palatinate. 
It was succeeded by Dreyers's third cabinets.

The cabinet comprises 10 ministers including the Minister-President. Six are members of the SPD, two are members of the Greens and two are members of the FDP.

Composition 

|}

References 

Cabinets of Rhineland-Palatinate
Cabinets established in 2016
2016 establishments in Germany
2021 disestablishments in Germany
Cabinets disestablished in 2021